The National Association for the Advancement of Colored People presents an annual NAACP Image Award.  Winners are selected by the NAACP president in recognition of special achievement and distinguished public service. The following are winners for the President's Award:

References

NAACP Image Awards